The Boston mayoral election of 1860 saw the election of Joseph Wightman, Boston's first mayor from the Democratic Party.

Results

See also
List of mayors of Boston, Massachusetts

References

Mayoral elections in Boston
Boston
Boston mayoral
19th century in Boston